Remedios Papa Dancel (February 27, 1929 – May 19, 2013), commonly known as Bella Flores, was a Filipina actress. She was best known for her "iconic" portrayals of film villains. She is popularly referred as the original “Queen of Kontrabidas” for being an enduring icon of Philippine culture and setting the standard on which kontrabidas will always be measured.

Life and career
Flores was born Remedios Papa Dancel in Manila to Matias Dancel, a slipper maker, and Emilia Papa. She was a college sophomore at the Far Eastern University when she appeared in her first film, Tatlong Balaraw (1950), at age 21.

Flores was signed by Sampaguita Pictures. She was cast in Roberta as the cruel stepmother of Tessie Agana's titular character, despite being 22 years old. The film was a box-office success, credited with saving Sampaguita Pictures from bankruptcy after a fire had destroyed its studio. The film's success also elevated Flores into the upper tier of stars, and typecast her in villainous roles. The film critic Nestor Torre remarked that Flores had "been making life miserable for many generations of hapless stars—all the way back to little Tessie Agana and Boy Alano in Roberta in the early 1950s, to her fresh batch of victims in the New Millennium... doing it without skipping a beat—and without aging (much) to boot." She received the 1967 FAMAS
Best Supporting Actress award for her role in Ang Kaibigan Kong Santo Niño and bella mora.

Filmography

Film

Television

Death
Flores died on May 19, 2013, in Quezon City General Hospital. Her death was a result of complications from a recent hip surgery.

Legacy

Bella Flores Foundation
The family of the late veteran actress Bella Flores plans to establish a foundation in her name and to organize a fundraising concert to benefit show business personalities with Alzheimer’s disease.

This was announced Tuesday night by singer Imelda Papin, Flores' niece. Flores was diagnosed with early stages of Alzheimer's and diabetes months before she died on May 19. The concert is tentatively set for July at the Aliw Theater in Pasay, Papin said.

Flores' daughter Ruby Arcilla said during the wake on Tuesday, "If mom's death could pave the way for… these projects, she would be very happy. She always tried to do what she could for her colleagues."

Arcilla said that a woman approached her during the wake to say thanks. "The lady said she showed mom her doctor’s prescription and mom gave what she could afford. I hope other actors would do the same – give from their hearts."

In popular culture
Former teen star Valerie Concepcion plays the role of the late veteran actress Bella Flores in a drama anthology of her feature story of Bella's lifetime in Star Confessions aired on TV5 (now The 5 Network) in 2011.
GMA 7 Comedian John Feir plays as "Belly Flori" a parody version of the late veteran actress Bella Flores in a defunct comedy Gag Show "Nuts Entertainment" on GMA 7 in 2003.

References

External links

1929 births
2013 deaths
20th-century Filipino actresses
21st-century Filipino actresses
Actresses from Manila
Far Eastern University alumni
Filipino child actresses
Filipino film actresses
People from Santa Cruz, Manila